A Welsh mortgage is a now-obsolete form of mortgage which could be created under English law.  Welsh mortgages were also used in other common law countries, including Ireland and Canada.  The main differences between a Welsh mortgage and a conventional mortgage were that:
 under a Welsh mortgage the mortgagee (the lender) would receive all of the rents and profits which arise from the land during the period of the mortgage, whereas under a conventional mortgage the mortgagor (the landowner) would receive these; and
 under a Welsh mortgage the mortgagee had no power to call for or sue for the principal sum; it was only the mortgagor who could elect to bring the mortgage to an end by repaying the principal. Conversely, in a conventional mortgage the mortgagee could call for repayment of the principal amount after the repayment date and sue for it or foreclose if it was not paid.

The exact form fluctuated slightly.  But Cooote on Mortgages described the concept as follows:
A Welsh mortgage in its original and strict form closely resembled the mortuum vadium described by Glanville, being a conveyance of an estate, redeemable at any time on payment of the principal without interest: the rents and profits of the estate until such redemption being taken without account by the mortgagee in lieu of interest.

Welsh mortgages were not subject to foreclosure.  Technically there is no period for redemption.  However if the mortgagor 'holds over' for a period of time which is sufficient to defeat a limitation claim, then the right to redeem is lost.

Early twentieth century legal writers sought to draw a loose parallel between Welsh mortgages and the vivum vadium (or living pledge), an ancient form of mortgage in Medieval conveyancing, whilst also noting that the parallels were inexact.

Variations

Certain types of variations on the tradition Welsh mortgage evolved over times.  Robins' Law of Mortgages describes these:
Another kind of Welsh mortgage, or security in the nature of a Welsh mortgage, rather resembling the ancient form of vivum vadium, is where an estate is assured to the mortgagee in fee or for a long term of years until out of the rents and profits he shall have received the amount of principal and interest.

A third variation on this form of security is, where an estate is demised to the mortgagee for a short term of years, to the intent that he may take the rents and profits during the term in lieu and full satisfaction of principal and interest, with a proviso for redemption at any time during the term of payment of principal and interest then due. On the expiration of the term the property will revert to the mortgage discharged from the debt.

Time period

The earliest recorded reference to a Welsh mortgage dates from 1726.

The latest reported case involving a Welsh mortgage is an Irish case: Re Cromin (1914) 1 IR 23 at 29.

By 1927 they were already being described as 'obsolete'.

Etymology

It is unclear where the term 'Welsh' comes from in relation to the mortgage; nothing in the usage of Welsh mortgages suggests any particular connection to Wales.  It is possible that the reference comes from a derivation of the verb, 'welching', in relation to the deviation from the conventional bargain implied by a mortgage, although the first recorded use of 'welching' dates from 1857, long after the first records of Welsh mortgages.  Other possibilities are the two terms had common roots, or that the reverse may be true, and that the term 'welching' may have evolved partly as a reference to the unusual form of Welsh mortgages.  

There are many examples in the English language from the 1700s and earlier of 'Welsh' being used either in disparaging nature or to indicate that something is of an inferior type: 'Welsh comb' (for using one's fingers, from 1796), or 'Welsh louse' (a cricket, from the 1590s), or 'Welsh rabbit' (later Welsh rarebit, from 1747).

Footnotes

Mortgage
English law
Common law